Vacuum bubble may refer to
Vacuum bubbles in quantum field theory
Vacuum bubbles in cosmology
Vacuum bubbles in hydrodynamics